Come and Get It: The Best of Apple Records is a greatest hits compilation album containing songs by artists signed to the Beatles' Apple record label between 1968 and 1973. The first such multi-artist Apple compilation, it was released on 25 October 2010. Among the artists are Badfinger, Mary Hopkin, James Taylor, Billy Preston, Jackie Lomax, Ronnie Spector and Hot Chocolate. In most cases, the recordings were produced by one of the Beatles, with George Harrison and Paul McCartney being the most heavily represented on the album.

History
The compilation accompanied a massive campaign by Apple Corps Ltd and EMI Music to reissue the albums originally released by the Beatles' record label, and the project and remastered albums are led by the same team of engineers that worked on the Beatles' 2009 remastered albums, John Lennon's 2010 remastered albums, and sixteen other 2010 remastered albums by various other artists (a song from each of these sixteen albums is on Come and Get It: The Best of Apple Records).

Track listing

References

External links
AppleRecords.com – official record label website

Apple Records compilation albums
2010 greatest hits albums
Record label compilation albums
Albums produced by George Harrison
Albums produced by John Lennon
Albums produced by Paul McCartney
Albums produced by Peter Asher
Albums produced by Phil Spector
Albums produced by Tony Visconti
Rock compilation albums